Ligia Maura Costa is a full professor at Escola de Administração de Empresas de São Paulo – Fundação Getulio Vargas (FGV-EAESP). She received her habilitation degree in international law ("livre-docência") from Faculdade de Direito da Universidade de São Paulo (FDUSP). She holds a PhD and a LL.M both in international trade law from the Université of Paris-X and a bachelor's degree in Law from FDUSP. She was a visiting scholar at the University of Michigan Law School and was a postdoctoral fellow at Sciences Po, Paris. She is author of several books and articles published in Brazil and abroad, having worked at the WTO in the Legal Affairs Division. Professor Costa was visiting professor at HEC-Paris during the spring 2011 and she is visiting professor at Universität St Gallen since 2007, teaching the course Doing Business in Latin America. She is professor at Sciences Po. Besides, she has taught and lectured in several other foreign countries, including US, Peru, Mexico and Argentina. She is Chair of the Americas Region in PIM (Partnership in International Management)

Books
"Negociação. Como Negociam Brasileiros e Franceses", Publisher: Quartier Latin,  (2010)
"Direito Internacional do Desenvolvimento Sustentável e os Códigos de Conduta de Responsabilidade Social. Análise do Setor do Gás e Petróleo", Publisher: Juruá,  (2009)
"Comércio Exterior: Negociação e Aspectos Legais", Publisher: Campus,  (2005)
"Internet: Guia Bibliográfico Comparado", Publisher: ieditora,  (2002)
"Le Crédit Documentaire. Etude Comparative", Publisher: LGDJ,  (1998)
"OMC: Manual Prático da Rodada Uruguai", Publisher: Saraiva,  (1996)
"O Credito Documentário: E as Novas Regras E Usos Uniformes Da Câmara De Comércio Internacional", Publisher: Saraiva,  (1993)

Articles
COSTA, L.M. Battling Corruption Through CSR Codes in Emerging Markets: Oil and Gás Industry. In: RAE Eletrônica. vol. 7, n. 1, Art. 8, jan/jun 2008. available at http://www.rae.com.br/eletronica/index.cfm?FuseAction=Artigo&ID=3424&Secao=ARTIGOS&Volume=7&Numero=1&Ano=2008

COSTA, L.M. Direitos Sociais e os Códigos de Conduta de Responsabilidade Social do Setor do Gás e do Petróleo. In: Lex. 7 de novembro de 2006. Available at http://www.lex.com.br/noticias/artigos/default.asp?artigo_id=1034984&dou=1

COSTA, L.M. ALCA = OMC + [NAFTA +/- MERCOSUL] Aspectos Jurídicos. In: Revista Saraivajur. 2003; Available at http://www.saraivajur.com.br/doutrinaArtigos.cfm?link=doutrinaEntrevistas.cfm&psqautor=&area=&autor=213&x=5&y=5

COSTA, L.M. OMC: Entendimento relativo às Normas e Procedimentos sobre Solução de Controvérsias. In: Revista Saraivajur. pp. 1–13. Available at http://www.saraivajur.com.br/doutrinaArtigosDetalhe.cfm?doutrina=303

COSTA, L.M. Understanding WTO Settlement of Disputes: What it is and How it Really Works. Part II. In: Inter American Trade Report. v. 10, n. 1. pp. 2–4, 2003. Available at https://web.archive.org/web/20120402214652/http://www.natlaw.com/bulletin/2003/0301/trene03.pdf

References

20th-century Brazilian lawyers
Living people
University of São Paulo alumni
University of Paris alumni
Academic staff of Fundação Getulio Vargas
University of Michigan faculty
Brazilian women lawyers
Year of birth missing (living people)
Brazilian expatriates in France
Academic staff of Sciences Po
21st-century Brazilian lawyers
Academic staff of HEC Paris